Adena may refer to:

Artists
ADENA, Romanian singer-songwriter
Adeena Karasick (born 1965), Canadian poet, performance artist, and essayist
Adena Halpern (born 1968), American author
Adena Jacobs (born 1982), Australian theatre director

Places
Adena, Colorado, an extinct town in Morgan County
Adena, Ohio, a village in Harrison and Jefferson counties
Adena Pointe, Ohio, an unincorporated community in Union County

Businesses
Adena Springs, Thoroughbred horse breeding operation
Adena Springs Ranch, former cattle ranch
Adena Court Apartments, apartment building

Other
Adena (name)
Adena culture, a mound-building Native American culture
Adena Mound, type site
Adena Mansion, Thomas Worthington's home and estate in Chillicothe, Ohio
A village in the Logo Anseba district in the Gash-Barka region in Eritrea
Adena High School, public high school in Frankfort, Ohio
, the Spanish section of the World Wide Fund for Nature
Adena Harmon, Founder and CEO of C-Hear, Inc., Founder AdpativApps PBC., and Elite Performance Data Labs, LLC of Texas. Technology for digital accessibility and sports analytics.